J. J. Perry is an American action director, martial artist, actor, and stuntman.

Career
Perry began practicing martial arts training in 1975, at the age of eight.  Because his mother was not able to afford her son's lessons, he cleaned a martial arts school, and received lessons in trade. He began performing stunt work in the late 1980s after leaving the military.

Perry was a fourth-degree black belt in taekwondo by 1993.

He began his acting career when he did stunt work for the character of Johnny Cage in the first Mortal Kombat film. He then played Scorpion, Cyrax, and Noob Saibot in Mortal Kombat: Annihilation (Chris Casamassa was supposed to reprise as Scorpion but was working on the film Batman & Robin, though he would return in Conquest), and appeared in the MK: Conquest TV series, this time as Scorpion's main rival Sub-Zero, in addition to doing stuntwork for the main character of Kung Lao. In addition to the Mortal Kombat series, Perry has done stuntwork for various television shows and movies such as Buffy the Vampire Slayer, The Scorpion King, 24, Beowulf and The Town as FBI Swat 2.  He was a member of the cast of the 2004 movie Sunland Heat, and part of the stunt team for the 2006 fighting movie Ultraviolet.

Perry shared in the Male Stuntman of the Year Award at the 2004 World Stunt Awards for his work in the 2003 action comedy film The Rundown. He was also voted 2012 Stunt Coordinator of the Year at the short-lived (2010-2012) ActionFest action movie festival (founded by Chuck Norris's stunt double, director, and younger brother Aaron Norris).

Awards
2 Times California State Champion
2 Times National Junior Olympian
Texas State Champion
2 Time All Army Champion
1990 Olympic Tae Kwon Do Team (Alternate)

Filmography

References

External links
 
 
"J.J. Perry Interview" 

1966 births
Living people
American stunt performers
American male film actors
American male television actors
Place of birth missing (living people)
American hapkido practitioners
American male taekwondo practitioners
Male actors from Santa Monica, California